Aldrit Oshafi (born 26 March 2000) is an Albanian professional footballer who plays as a midfielder for Albanian club Teuta Durres.

Club career
Aldrit Oshafi made his professional debut on September 28, 2016, in a 3-0 defeat against FK Kukësi. On October 26, 2016, he was called up to the Albania U-17 squad in a 1-0 defeat against Italy. He scored his first goal in for Tomori Berat on April 29, 2017 against Shkumbini Peqin. In summer 2018 he moved to Luftëtari Gjirokastër.

Career statistics

Club

References

External links
 Aldrit Oshafi profile FSHF.org
 
 

2000 births
Living people
Sportspeople from Berat
Association football midfielders
Albanian footballers
Albania youth international footballers
FK Tomori Berat players
Besa Kavajë players
Luftëtari Gjirokastër players
Kategoria e Parë players
Kategoria Superiore players